is a Japanese freestyle skier.
 
She competed in the 2018 Winter Olympics, in ski cross. She also participated in the 2009, 2011, 2015 and 2017 FIS Freestyle World Ski Championships.

References

External links

1983 births
Living people
Japanese female alpine skiers
Japanese female freestyle skiers
Olympic freestyle skiers of Japan
Freestyle skiers at the 2018 Winter Olympics
Asian Games medalists in alpine skiing
Asian Games gold medalists for Japan
Alpine skiers at the 2003 Asian Winter Games
Medalists at the 2003 Asian Winter Games
21st-century Japanese women